Three submarines of the United States Navy have been named USS Silversides, for the silversides, a small fish marked with a silvery stripe along each side of its body.

  was a  that served during World War II. Now a museum ship in Muskegon, Michigan
 , a planned 

United States Navy ship names